Avijit Singh (born 1 September 1996) is an Indian cricketer. He made his Twenty20 debut on 16 January 2021, for Railways in the 2020–21 Syed Mushtaq Ali Trophy.

References

External links
 

1996 births
Living people
Indian cricketers
Railways cricketers
Place of birth missing (living people)